The following lists events that happened during 1945 in North Korea, then governed by the People's Republic of Korea and Soviet Civil Administration.(To see what happened before the liberation of korea on August 15th, see 1945 in Korea. To see what happened in South Korea during the same period see 1945 in South Korea.)

Incumbents
Chairman of the National People's Representative Conference(for the people's republic of korea):Lyuh Woon-hyung

Head of civil administration:Terenty Shtykov

Events

August
August 15 -Transfer of power happens in 9 a.m from the Japanese to Lyuh Woon-hyung(head of the people's republic) in Seoul(This decision was rescinded after the Soviets do not go further down all the way to Seoul.Japan takes back control in August 20th). Korea liberated after the broadcast of the surrender speech of Japanese Emperor Showa.Soviet invasion of Manchuria is ongoing in Chongjin.
August 16- Soviet takes over Chongjin.Committee for the Preparation of Korean Independence (CPKI) is founded by Lyuh Woon-hyung.
August 20- Soviets arrive in Wonsan.
August 22-Soviets occupy Pyongyang.

September
September 6- People's Republic of Korea is officially proclaimed.
September 11-The Kyongui line officially ceases operation due to the division of korea.
September 16- The soviet civil administration is officially proclaimed.

October
October 10- Kim Il sung founds the North Korean Branch Bureau of the Communist Party of Korea.

November
November 23-Sinuiju incident occurs.

December
December 16-North korea is affected by the situation related to the Moscow Conference (1945).

References

1940s in North Korea
Years of the 20th century in North Korea
1945 in North Korea